Pseudeuphausia is a genus of krill (small marine crustaceans) comprising two species:
Pseudeuphausia latifrons (G. O. Sars, 1883)
Pseudeuphausia sinica Wang & Chen, 1963

References

Krill
Crustacean genera
Taxa named by Hans Jacob Hansen